Terrence Nolen, usually called Terry Nolen, is an American theater director and the producing artistic director of the Arden Theatre Company.

In 1988, Nolen co-founded the Arden Theatre Company with  Amy Murphy and Aaron Posner. He has helped the Arden garner 182 Barrymore Award nominations and 35 awards. He has won the 2006 Barrymore for best director for Opus and Winesberg, Ohio, the  Harold Prince Award For Outstanding Direction of a Musical for Sweeney Todd: The Demon Barber of Fleet Street in 2005, and the Harold Prince Award For Outstanding Direction of a Musical for The Baker's Wife in 2001.

Interviews
http://phillyist.com/2006/06/02/phillyist_inter_9.php
http://pennsylvania.broadwayworld.com/viewcolumn.cfm?colid=21609
http://www.broadwayworld.com/viewcolumn.cfm?colid=21609

References

American theatre directors
Living people
Year of birth missing (living people)